The 1988 World Karate Championships are the 9th edition of the World Karate Championships, and were held in Cairo, Egypt in October 1988.

Medalists

Men

Women

Medal table

References

 Results
 Results

External links
 Karateka magazine report
 World Karate Federation

World Karate Championships
World Championships
World Karate Championships
Karate Championships
World Karate Championships, 1988
World Championships, 1988
World Karate Championships